Hebenstretia lanceolata is a species of plant from South Africa. It belongs to the figwort family.

Description 
Flowers are present between September and November. They grow in spikes and are white with orange markings. They are hairy below the lobes and the calyx has a tooth at the tip. The fruit is a vacuolate ellipsoid with two approximately equal mericarps.

Distribution and habitat 
This plant is endemic to the Western Cape of South Africa.

Conservation 
Hebenstretia lanceolata is classified as being of least concern.

References 

Flora of South Africa
Plants described in 1901
Scrophulariaceae
Taxa named by Ernst Heinrich Friedrich Meyer
Taxa named by Robert Allen Rolfe